The grey-breasted spiderhunter (Arachnothera modesta) is a species of bird in the family Nectariniidae.
It is found in Brunei, Indonesia, Malaysia, Myanmar, Singapore, Thailand, and Vietnam.
Its natural habitats are subtropical or tropical moist lowland forest and subtropical or tropical moist montane forest. It is sometimes considered conspecific with the streaky-breasted spiderhunter.

Gallery

References

 BirdLife International 2004.  Arachnothera modesta.   2006 IUCN Red List of Threatened Species.   Downloaded on 25 July 2007.

grey-breasted spiderhunter
Birds of Malesia
grey-breasted spiderhunter
grey-breasted spiderhunter
Articles containing video clips
Taxonomy articles created by Polbot